The 2022 Colonial Athletic Association men's basketball tournament was the postseason men's college basketball tournament for the Colonial Athletic Association for the 2021–22 NCAA Division I men's basketball season. The tournament was held March 5–8, 2022, at the Entertainment and Sports Arena in Washington, D.C. The winner, the Delaware Fightin' Blue Hens, received the conference's automatic bid to the 2022 NCAA tournament.

Seeds

Schedule

Bracket

* denotes overtime game

See also
 2022 CAA women's basketball tournament

References

External links
 2022 CAA Men's Basketball Championship

Colonial Athletic Association men's basketball tournament
Tournament
College basketball tournaments in Washington, D.C.
CAA men's basketball tournament
CAA men's basketball tournament